AS S1 and AS S2 were two twin models of passenger cars manufactured by Towarzystwo Budowy Samochodów AS in Warsaw, Poland from 1927 to 1930. The two models differed with their engines and existed in 4 versions of car body style: taxi landaulet, convertible, limousine and panel van.

History 
The car was designed and assembled by Towarzystwo Budowy Samochodów AS in Warsaw, Poland, in the Warszawskie Autowarsztaty factory at 64 Złota Street. The chassis for the car was designed by Aleksander Liberman, with first prototypes being made on 4 January 1927. On 27 March 1927, the final version was manufactured in Fabryka Powozów Braci Węgrzeckich located in Szydłowiec, Poland.

After a few months of road tests, the car had been allowed to be sold. It was manufactured in 4 car body styles: taxi landaulet, convertible, limousine and panel van. The taxi landaulet version was the most popular, having around 100 cars being made, while the other version had around 50 cars made for each one. The customers could have also ordered only the chassis, paying a lower price.

The car was manufactured in 2 versions, with different engines: S1 and S2. S1 used engine manufactured by Chapuis-Dornier while S2, by CIME. The first models of the car also used the engine made by Ruby. All engines, as well as the gearbox were imported from France. The rest of the elements of the car were manufactured in Poland.

The car manufacturing company was awarded the silver medal for its AS cars at the 1929 Polish General Exhibition in Poznań. Its cars also arouse interest at the exhibition. AS was mostly praised for its noiseless, non-resistive, and precise way of closing its doors. The car stopped being manufactured in 1930, due to the Great Depression.

There were around 150 AS cars manufactured. They were made in 3 series, the first two countings respectively 60 and 80 cars. The third series was planned to count 100 cars, however, only a small number of cars that series has been manufactured.

There is no AS car left. It is known that one of the cars, has been used in the barricade at the Wilcza Street, during the Warsaw Uprising in 1944. One AS car, and probably the last of that model to survive the World War II, was used as a taxi in Warsaw, until the first half of the 1950s.

Specifications 
The car was available in two versions with different engines: S1 and S2. AS S1 had straight-four flathead Chapuis-Dornier engine with capacity of 990 cm³ and 17 KM power. The AS S2 had a straight-four overhead valve CIME engine with the capacity of 1203 cm³ 24 KM power. The car was manufactured in 4 car body styles: taxi landaulet, convertible, limousine and panel van.

References 

1920s cars
1930s cars
Cars introduced in 1927
Cars of Poland
Convertibles
Limousines
Vans
Taxi vehicles